The Magic Mousetrap is a Big Finish Productions audio drama based on the long-running British science fiction television series Doctor Who.

Plot

The Doctor meets an old enemy in 1926 Switzerland at an exclusive sanatorium in the Alpine Mountains.

Cast

Seventh Doctor – Sylvester McCoy
Ace – Sophie Aldred
Hex – Philip Olivier
Ludovic "Ludo" Comfort – Paul Antony-Barber
Lola Luna – Joan Walker
Swapnil Khan – Nadim Sawalha
Queenie Glasscock – Nadine Lewington
Harry Randall – Andrew Fettes
Herbert Randall – Andrew Dickens

The Three Companions
The Three Companions bonus feature, Part 1.

Polly's Story by Marc Platt

Polly – Anneke Wills
The Brigadier – Nicholas Courtney
Thomas Brewster – John Pickard

Continuity
The Chess elements in The Magic Mousetrap lead the Doctor on a path that is finally paid off in the 2012 story, Gods and Monsters

Notes
Magic Mousetrap
This marks Big Finish's first use of the character the Celestial Toymaker.  He appeared in only one TV story in 1966, The Celestial Toymaker, alongside the First Doctor.
The Toymaker was originally played by Michael Gough.  At the time of this audio's release, he was 92 years old and retired from acting.
Gough was set to return as the Toymaker 20 years later, alongside the Sixth Doctor, in the TV story The Nightmare Fair, but that script was scrapped in favour of The Trial of a Time Lord season.  This story is resurrected by Big Finish later in 2009 as part of their Lost Stories series.  Colin Baker plays the Sixth Doctor, but the Toymaker is played by David Bailie.

The Three Companions
Instead of the usual interviews, the end of the second disk features the first episode of The Three Companions.  It will consist of twelve ten-minute episodes at the end of this and the subsequent eleven monthly releases.  It is written by Marc Platt and stars Anneke Wills, Nicholas Courtney and John Pickard as Polly, The Brigadier and Thomas Brewster respectively.
The blog that instigates Polly's correspondence was written by the Third Doctor's assistant, Jo Grant.  It can be heard in its entirety in The Doll of Death.

External links
Big Finish Productions – The Magic Mousetrap

2009 audio plays
Seventh Doctor audio plays
Fiction set in 1926